The Nippon Professional Baseball Comeback Player of the Year Award is given to one player in each league of Central League and Pacific League.

NPB Comeback Player of the Year Award

See also
Nippon Professional Baseball#Awards
Baseball awards#Japan
Major League Baseball Comeback Player of the Year Award

Nippon Professional Baseball trophies and awards
Awards established in 1974
Most improved awards